David Antônio Corrêa (5 June 1937 – 10 May 2020) was a Brazilian singer-songwriter of the genres samba, samba-enredo and pagode.

Life
As a singer-songwriter, Corrêa released four studio albums and three extended plays from 1976 to 1991.

At the Rio de Janeiro carnival, Corrêa composed various Samba-enredos for various Samba schools, such as Portela, Acadêmicos do Salgueiro, Unidos de Vila Isabel, Imperatriz Leopoldinense, Estação Primeira de Mangueira, Estácio de Sá and Unidos da Ponte, over his 19 years samba-enredo composer career. His most successful year was 1980, in which Portela, the school he was representing and composed the samba-enredo for, won the Rio Carnival samba school parade.

Death
On 17 April 2020, Corrêa was run over by a vehicle in Rio de Janeiro, which required him to be hospitalized to have surgery.

Less than a month after being run over, Corrêa died in Rio de Janeiro after following kidney failure brought on by COVID-19 during the COVID-19 pandemic in Brazil.

Samba-enredos composed for Rio Carnival

Discography

Studio albums

Extended plays

References

1937 births
Rio Carnival
People from São João de Meriti
20th-century Brazilian male singers
20th-century Brazilian singers
Samba musicians
Samba enredo composers
21st-century Brazilian male singers
21st-century Brazilian singers
2020 deaths
Brazilian male singer-songwriters
Deaths from the COVID-19 pandemic in Rio de Janeiro (state)